The 1968 Winter Olympic Games cross-country skiing results.

Medal summary

Medal table

Men's events

Women's events

References

External links
Official Olympic Report

 
1968 Winter Olympics
1968 Winter Olympics events
Olympics
Cross-country skiing competitions in France